Murray Leibbrandt is professor, NRF Chair in Poverty and Inequality Research - and Director of the Southern Africa Labour and Development Research Unit at the University of Cape Town. He is a South African academic economist studying labour markets, trends in inequality, and poverty in South Africa. He is a fellow at the IZA Institute of Labor Economics.

Education 

He received a Bachelors in Economics from Rhodes University in 1983. He then proceeded to University of Notre Dame, where he read for Masters and doctorate degrees, graduating in 1986 and 1993 respectively.

Academic career 

In 1999, Leibbrandt with his colleagues - Ingrid Woolard and Haroon Bhorat - conducted a series of studies intended to study the dynamics of inequality in South Africa up to that point. They show that race largely correlates with lower income and inequality, and the reliance of Gauteng, South Africa's economic hub, on migrant labour - to fill its chronic labour shortfall.

Leibbrandt is the Principal Investigator of South Africa’s national household panel survey, the National Income Dynamics Study (NIDS) - which was first published in 2008.

References

External links

Murray Leibbrandt UCT page
Murray Leibbrandt website
Murray Leibbrandt Google Scholar page

Rhodes University alumni
University of Notre Dame alumni
Academic staff of the University of Cape Town
Living people
20th-century South African economists
Labor economists
Development economists
Year of birth missing (living people)
21st-century South African economists